Lawitta is a rural locality in the local government area (LGA) of Derwent Valley in the South-east LGA region of Tasmania. The 2016 census recorded a population of 232 for the state suburb of Lawitta.

History 
Lawitta was gazetted as a locality in 1970.

Geography
The Derwent River forms the south-western boundary. The Derwent Valley Railway line follows the southern and south-western boundaries.

Road infrastructure 
Route A10 (Lyell Highway) runs through from south-east to south-west.

References

Towns in Tasmania
Localities of Derwent Valley Council